The 1936 South Dakota gubernatorial election was held on November 3, 1936. Incumbent Democratic Governor Tom Berry ran for re-election to a third term, the first Governor of South Dakota to do so. Berry was challenged by Republican Leslie Jensen, the former Collector of Internal Revenue for the state of South Dakota. Both Berry and Jensen won their primaries uncontested and advanced to the general election. Some drama surrounded the potential candidacy of Democratic State Auditor George O'Neill as an independent candidate for Governor or, in the alternative, his cross-party endorsement of Jensen; after initially announcing his campaign and hedging, O'Neill dropped out of the race in September and endorsed the Democratic ticket in the state, including Berry.

The primary issue during the campaign was the drought caused by regional dust storms as part of the Dust Bowl. Republicans attacked Governor Berry's administration for providing inadequate relief to South Dakotan farmers. But Berry's willingness to break the state's unwritten political tradition by seeking a third term was apparently controversial. In the closing days of the campaign, Herbert E. Hitchcock, the Chairman of the South Dakota Democratic Party, emphasized how unwilling Berry had been to seek a third term: "Tom Berry was forced into running for a third term by Democrats and Republicans alike. I, among others, insisted that he lay aside his personal wishes and become a candidate because I felt and thoughts of others felt he owed it to the state of South Dakota to do so."

However, despite Berry's wide victories in 1932 and 1934, he narrowly lost re-election to Jensen. However, President Franklin Roosevelt carried the state by a fairly wide margin, and Democratic Senator William J. Bulow narrowly won re-election.

General election

Results

References

South Dakota
1936
Gubernatorial
November 1936 events